The Choptank River is a major tributary of the Chesapeake Bay and the largest river on the Delmarva Peninsula. It is located north of the Nanticoke River, and its mouth is located south of Eastern Bay. Cambridge, the county seat of Dorchester County, and Denton, the county seat of Caroline County, are located on its south shore.

The river is named after the native Choptank people.

Course
The Choptank River begins at Choptank Mills, Delaware, where Tidy Island Creek and Culbreth Marsh Ditch join together. It ends at the Chesapeake Bay in a very wide mouth between Blackwalnut Point on Tilghman Island, and Cook Point, near Hudson, Maryland. Tidy Island Creek and Culbreth Marsh Ditch rise in western Kent County, Delaware. The entire watershed is in the coastal plain.

Navigability
The river is navigable up to Denton, about 45 miles upriver.  The bridge at Cambridge limits traffic to 50 feet vertical clearance.  The river’s mouth is marked in the main channel by an abandoned, tilting masonry lighthouse on the underwater Sharps’ Island. Knapp’s Narrows offers a shortcut to boats approaching from the north.

Tributaries
Its main tributaries are the Tred Avon River and Tuckahoe Creek on the north side, and Cabin Creek and Hunting Creek on the south side. There are several small creeks on the northern shore, including Harris Creek, Broad Creek, Irish Creek, Island Creek, La Trappe Creek, Bolingbroke Creek, Mile Creek, Kings Creek, Forge Branch and Broadway Branch. On the southern shore the small creeks include Jenkins Creek, the Warwick River, Marsh Creek, Maryland, Skeleton Creek, Mitchell Run, Hog Creek, Fowling Creek, Robins Creek, Church Creek, Williston Creek, Watts Creek, Chapel Branch, Spring Branch, Gravelly Branch and Cow Marsh Creek.

See also
List of rivers of Delaware
List of rivers of Maryland

References

United States Geological Survey. 7.5 minute series topographic quadrangles.

Tributaries of the Chesapeake Bay
Rivers of Delaware
Rivers of Maryland
Rivers of Caroline County, Maryland
Rivers of Kent County, Delaware